Ernest Florman ( – ) was a Swedish director, film photographer and royal photographer.

His father Gösta Florman established a photography firm in Kristinehamn, Värmland.

Biography
Florman's short film  is often referred to as the first completely Swedish film. It documents the arrival of King Chulalongkorn of Siam at the Logårdstrappan at Stockholm Castle, where he was received by King Oscar II. The recording equipment had been brought there by the French film photographer Alexandre Promio, as he was in Sweden doing work for the Lumière Brothers to present his new medium. Promio took on Florman as his apprentice in this new artistic medium.

During the 1897 Exhibition two Swedish feature films were made. One was Slagsmål i Gamla Stockholm  and was filmed by Promio with Florman as an assistant. The film had its premiere on 3 July 1897. At the same time Florman filmed and directed the film Byrakstugan which had its premiere on 14 August 1897.

Between 1901 and 1936 Florman was the chairman of Svenska Fotografers Förbund.

Films
1897 - 
1897 - 
1897 - 
1903 -

References

External links
 

1863 births
1952 deaths